Nada Mufid Kawar (born 23 November 1975) is a retired Jordanian athlete who specialised in the shot put. She represented her country at the 1996 and 2000 Summer Olympics, as well as two World Championships, however, without qualifying for the final rounds. She holds multiple national records.

Competition record

Personal bests
Outdoor
Shot put – 17.83 (Los Angeles 2000) 
Discus throw – 60.11 (La Jolla 1998) 
Hammer throw – 44.66 (Westwood 1998) 

Indoor
Shot put – 17.74 (Colorado Springs 1999)

References

1975 births
Living people
Jordanian shot putters
Jordanian discus throwers
Jordanian hammer throwers
Athletes (track and field) at the 1996 Summer Olympics
Athletes (track and field) at the 2000 Summer Olympics
Olympic athletes of Jordan
Female shot putters
Female discus throwers
Female hammer throwers
Jordanian female athletes
World Athletics Championships athletes for Jordan